The Central District of Basht County is a district (bakhsh) in Basht County, Kohgiluyeh and Boyer-Ahmad Province, Iran. At the 2006 census, its population was 12,401, in 2,454 families.  The District has one city: Basht. The District has one rural district (dehestan): Kuh Mareh Khami Rural District.

References 

Districts of Kohgiluyeh and Boyer-Ahmad Province
Basht County